Below is a list of things, primarily in the fields of mathematics and physics, named in honour of Paul Adrien Maurice Dirac.

Physics
Dirac large numbers hypothesis
Dirac monopole
Dirac string
Dirac's string trick

Quantum physics

Notations

Dirac notation
Dirac bracket

Equations and related objects

Dirac adjoint
Dirac cone
Dirac points
 Dirac constant, see reduced Planck constant
Dirac–Coulomb–Breit Hamiltonian
Dirac equation
Dirac equation in curved spacetime
Dirac equation in the algebra of physical space
Nonlinear Dirac equation
Two-body Dirac equations
Dirac fermion
Dirac field
Dirac gauge
Dirac hole theory
Dirac Lagrangian
Dirac matrices
Dirac matter
Dirac membrane
Dirac picture
Dirac sea
Dirac spectrum
Dirac spinor

Formalisms

Fermi–Dirac statistics
Dirac–von Neumann axioms

Effects

Abraham–Lorentz–Dirac force
Kapitsa–Dirac effect

Pure and applied mathematics

Complete Fermi–Dirac integral
Incomplete Fermi–Dirac integral
Dirac delta function
Dirac comb
Dirac measure
Dirac operator
Dirac algebra

Other uses
5997 Dirac, an asteroid
 The various Dirac Medals
Dirac (software)
DiRAC supercomputing research facility of the Science and Technology Facilities Council
Dirac Science Library, at Florida State University
Dirac road, Bristol,.

Endnotes

Dirac
Paul Dirac